Bálint Virág (born 1973) is a Hungarian mathematician working in Canada, known for his work in probability theory, particularly determinantal processes, random matrix theory, and random walks and other probabilistic questions on groups. He received his Ph.D. from U.C. Berkeley in 2000, under the direction of Yuval Peres, and was a post-doc at MIT. Since 2003 he has been a Canada research chair at the University of Toronto.

Virág was awarded a Sloan Fellowship (2004), the Rollo Davidson Prize (2008), the Coxeter–James Prize (2010), and the John L. Synge Award (2014). He was an invited speaker at the International Congress of Mathematicians in 2014.

References

External links 
 Bálint Virág at the University of Toronto

Probability theorists
Living people
Canada Research Chairs
1973 births
21st-century Hungarian mathematicians
21st-century Canadian mathematicians
Academic staff of the University of Toronto
Massachusetts Institute of Technology alumni
University of California, Berkeley alumni
Scientists from Toronto